Shira Geffen (born April 23, 1971) is an Israeli actress, screenwriter, film director and children's book writer.

Biography
Shira Geffen was born in 1971. Her father, Yehonatan Geffen, is an author. Her brother, Aviv Geffen, is a singer. She was also the niece of film director Assi Dayan. She is married to Israeli author Etgar Keret. They have one son.

Acting and directing career
She has acted in a television series, BeTipul, and in films. She has also written and directed two films, Jellyfish, and Self Made. Jellyfish was written by her and directed by her husband; it won the Camera d'Or at the 2007 Cannes Film Festival. In 2014, she directed Self Made, also known as Boreg in Israel. It was presented at the Cannes Film Festival and at the Jerusalem Film Festival.

Views and opinions
At the 2014 Jerusalem Film Festival, she wrote a letter calling for an end to the conflict in Gaza together with Keren Yedaya and other filmmakers.

Awards and recognition
Geffen won  First Prize at the Haifa Children's Theater Festival in 1998 and the Hadassah Prize in 2003. In 2007, Geffen and her husband Etgar Keret won the Cannes Film Festival's Camera d'Or Award for Jellyfish. The French Artists' and Writers' Guild also awarded Geffen and Keret the Best Director Award (2007).

See also
Israeli literature
Culture of Israel

References

External links
 

Living people
1971 births
21st-century Israeli actresses
Israeli female screenwriters
Israeli film producers
Israeli film actresses
Israeli television actresses
Israeli women children's writers
Israeli people of Ukrainian-Jewish descent
Israeli people of Syrian-Jewish descent
Directors of Caméra d'Or winners